Three Days is a 1991 Lithuanian drama film directed by Šarūnas Bartas. It is set in Kaliningrad and tells the story of four young people, two Lithuanian boys and two Russian girls, who due to misery and self-absorbation are uncapable of anything other than physical connection.

The film was shown in the Forum section of the 42nd Berlin International Film Festival, where it received two awards. It was nominated for Best Young European Film at the 5th European Film Awards.

Cast
 Yekaterina Golubeva
 Rimma Latypova
 Arūnas Sakalauskas
 Audrius Stonys

References

External links

1992 films
Films directed by Šarūnas Bartas
Lithuanian-language films
Lithuanian drama films